Katrin Schreiter (born February 24, 1969, in Arnstadt) is a retired German sprinter who specialized in the 400 metres.

At the 1991 IAAF World Indoor Championships in Seville Schreiter helped win the gold medal in an indoor world record time of 3:27.22 minutes. The teammates were Sandra Seuser, Annett Hesselbarth and Grit Breuer. At the 1991 World Championships in Athletics Schreiter ran in the heats for the German team who later finished third in the final.

External links

1969 births
Living people
German female sprinters
World Athletics Indoor Championships winners
People from Arnstadt
Sportspeople from Thuringia